Kozojedy may refer to places in the Czech Republic:

Kozojedy (Jičín District), a municipality and village in the Hradec Králové Region
Kozojedy (Plzeň-North District), a municipality and village in the Plzeň Region
Kozojedy (Prague-East District), a municipality and village in the Central Bohemian Region
Kozojedy (Rakovník District), a municipality and village in the Central Bohemian Region
Kozojedy, a village and part of Lány (Chrudim District) in the Pardubice Region